Plaid  may refer to:

Fabric 
 Full plaid, a cloth made with a tartan pattern, wrapped around the waist, cast over the shoulder and fastened at the front
 A synonym for tartan in North America
 A plaid shirt, typically of flannel and worn during the winter
 A plaid jacket, often made of Mackinaw cloth
 Belted plaid or "great kilt", an earlier form of the kilt
 Windowpane plaid, a way of crossing warp and weft to create a pattern

Others
Plaid (album), a 1992 album by guitarist Blues Saraceno
Plaid (band), a British electronic music duo, taking their name from the Welsh word for party
Plaid Cymru, a political party in Wales
Plaid Inc., a financial technology company specializing in bank login verification
Plaid Loch, freshwater lake in East Ayrshire, Scotland, UK
Plaid speed, a faster than light speed from the movie Spaceballs
Plaid, branding for the three motor version of the Tesla Model S

See also
 Plad, an unincorporated community in Dallas County, Missouri
 Played (disambiguation)